Andrew Job Ward (February 16, 1843 – March 9, 1914) was a Michigan politician.  He was elected as the Mayor of City of Flint in 1893 for a single 1-year term.

References

Mayors of Flint, Michigan
1843 births
1914 deaths
19th-century American politicians
People from Medina County, Ohio